Sound Thoma is a 2013 Malayalam comedy film directed by Vysakh. It features Dileep playing a character with a cleft lip and defective voice while Namitha Pramod, Sai Kumar, Mukesh, and Subbaraju portray supporting roles. The film, produced by Anoop, features background score and soundtrack composed by Gopi Sundar and the lyrics were written by Rajeev Alunkal and Nadirsha. Cinematography handled by Shaji Kumar.

Plot
The story starts with Plapparambil family. It tells the family life of Plapparambil Paulo, a ruthless and miser moneylender, who has three children named Mathai, Joykutty and Thoma. Mathai, the eldest son, is thrown out by Paulo as he converted into Islam to marry his lover. He is enough educated and was authorised to run their own jewellery, later held by Joykutty, the second son. 

Meanwhile, Paulo' next two sons are unmarried. His youngest son Thoma suffers from cleft lip, and thus has a defective voice, but he still loves to sing. Paulo and his family is hated by the locals of the Kuttanadu region. Thoma falls in love with Sreelakshmi, the daughter of Shankaran Bhagavathar, a dance teacher who is also one among the creditor of Paulo and the neighbour of Mathai. Bhagavathar and even Sreelakshmi hates the family thus she rejects the love of Thoma. Here arrives the antagonist, an S. I named Rakesh who has an old score with the rich moneylender Paulo as his father Raghavan Panicker is ashamed in front of the local after he is arrested by the police on an embezzlement years ago. He vows to destroy the Plapparambil family.

Thoma decides to overwrite the dislike of the locals towards his family by forcing Paulo to conduct a mass marriage of five orphaned girls so that both, the dislike by locals to the family can be removed and Joykutty will get better alliances from better family, thus Paulo would be able to fetch his target of 20 million. Paulo accepts the idea.

On the day of the marriage, everything goes well but one of orphan girl Sindhu's groom Vishambharan runs away from the marriage as his father threatens him that if he marries an orphan girl he will break Vishambharan's leg. Thoma tries to tell that anybody else who came to see the marriage can marry her. But some people leaves the place. The Panchayat President Mahadevan tells Paulo to marry one of his son to Sindhu. They selects Joykutty to marry her but Paulo refuses to it. Paulo's Assistant Urupadi accidentally tells everyone about their plan to change the dislike of the locals towards him and to get Joykutty married for two crores. Paulo angrily slaps Urupadi for telling their plan to everyone. The locals gets angry and holds Joykutty and threatens him to marry Sindhu. Thoma and Urupadi tries to stop it but it fails. As Paulo sees Joykutty marrying Sindhu he gets heartbroken and faints. He scolds Thoma and Urupadi for everything at his home. Joykutty arrives there with Sindhu and Mathai to apologise but Paulo kicks him out of the house for marrying her against his wish. Joykutty then starts living in Mathai's home. Paulo then has only Thoma has his only son and he has many wishes for him. They goes to a ENT doctor and the doctor tells him that this cleft lip can be recovered but he won't get his voice back. He tries to convince Sreelakshmi about his love but she refuses. Thoma helps Bhagavathar to give back their home by giving him a money without his father's knowledge. Soon Sreelakshmi gets engaged to Rakesh. When Thoma learns of this, he gets drunk and tells to them that he will stop the marriage by attacking Rakesh and throwing sand on their Sadya. Mathai and Joykutty sees this and stops him. When Mathai tells her that Thoma helped her to give her home back without his father's knowledge, she realises her love towards Thoma. Bhagavathar then lodges a complaint to Rakesh about Thoma. Rakesh beats Thoma but Sreelakshmi stops it by telling him that Thoma is her fiancé which made him and the locals happy. 

One day Paulo captures Vishambharan and hits him for his loss. Vishambharan reveals that Joykutty and Sindhu were in love and Thoma was the mastermind behind their marriage. He bribed Mahadevan and made him to stand with Thoma and Joykutty. When nobody was ready to marry Sindhu, Thoma made Mahadevan to convey Joykutty's feelings to Paulo. When Paulo finds out that Thoma was cheating him, he hits Thoma and kicks him out of the house. He tells that his is going to live without anyone's help and he will show it to Thoma. Thoma reveals the whole incident to Sreelakshmi. He even tells that Joykutty begged Thoma to marry Sindhu to him as she is pregnant to Joykutty's baby. Sreelakshmi tells Thoma that Paulo will call him back. Meanwhile, Paulo finds out that his money 30 crores was stolen and he believes that Thoma stole it. He angrily goes to Mathai's house and asks where Thoma is but he wasn't there. He tells that Thoma stole his money and everyone hears it. Paulo asks his sons frankly to tell Thoma his money back. The locals destroys Paulo's Chitti company. Paulo joins hands with Rakesh to find Thoma. One day, Kuttanpillai, a tea vendor sees Thoma. When he reveals the whole incident to Thoma, Rakesh arrives there with Paulo. When he was going to arrest Thoma he lies that Paulo's 30 crores were hawala money so he will arrest Paulo first. Rakesh reveals that he was betraying Paulo as he ashamed his father and made him to be arrested. He then handcuffs Thoma and Paulo and made them to walk all over the place to show locals in the same way how Paulo made Raghavan to walk. Paulo tells to the locals that Rakesh cheated him. Angrily he slaps Paulo. Thoma hits Rakesh for slapping Paulo and Rakesh beats Thoma and makes him unconscious. Rakesh then removes his belt and hits Paulo with. As Thoma sees his father getting beaten up, he fights back with Rakesh and saves his father. The fight stopped by Thoma's uncle Manikunju who reveals that he built some places like orphanages, schools with Paulo's money and Thoma helped him for it. He gave the money fr a benefit for the villagers. Mathai threatens to kill Rakesh if he hits Thoma and Paulo. The locals tells Rakesh to go away from the place otherwise they will kill him. Thoma apologises to Paulo, where Paulo  realises his mistake and apologize to everyone who he had done bad things. 

In a speech said by Paulo he reveals that Thoma changed him and his voice his the correct sound, after this, Bhagavathar fixes Sreelakshmi's marriage with Thoma.

Cast

Dileep as Plapparambil Thoma
Sai Kumar as Plapparambil Paulo, Thoma’s father
Mukesh as Plapparambil Mathai aka Mustafa, Paulo’s eldest son and Thoma’s eldest brother who is banned from the house after converting to Islam to marry his lover
Namitha Pramod as Sreelakshmi
Shiju as Plapparambil Joykutty, Paulo’s middle son and Thoma’s 2nd brother
Subbaraju as SI Rakesh (Voiceover by)Shobi Thilakan
Nedumudi Venu as Manikunju, Thoma’s uncle
Suraj Venjaramoodu as Udupidi
Vijayaraghavan as Sankaran Bhagavathar (Sreelakshmi's father)
Kalabhavan Shajon as Sabu
Dharmajan Bolgatty as Kittunni
Reshmi Boban as Amina Musthafa Mathai/Musthafa's wife
 Majeed as Khader, Mathai’s/Musthafa’s father-in-law and Amina’s father
Ambika Mohan as Lathika, SI Rakesh's aunt
Soja Jolly as Sindhu
Nandu Pothuval as Stephen
Kalabhavan Haneef as Andrews, Tea Shop Owner
Santhosh as Raghavan Panicker
Joju George as Chacko
Kollam Thulasi as Mahadevan
Balachandran Chullikad as Dr. George Joseph
Subbalakshmi
Kochu Preman as Kuttan Pillai
Baby Akshai as Mathai/Musthafa's son
Durga Premjith as Mathai/Musthafa's daughter

Soundtrack

The soundtrack was composed by Gopi Sundar, with lyrics by Murukan Kattakada, Nadirsha, Rajeev Alunkal.

Reception

Critical Reception
With an aggregate review score of 3/5 at "Reviewbol.com", the film earned mixed reviews from critics while response from the audience was generally positive. The film ultimately went on to become a box-office success and ran for over a 100 days.

Unni R. Nair of Kerala9.com rated the film  and said that the film was "OK for Dileep fans and the family audience". Theaterbalcony gave it a total score of 57% on 100.

Box office
The film was commercial success, and ran over 100 days in theatres. The film collected 4.77 lakhs from UK box office in two weekends and 2.48 lakhs from US box office in its first weekend.

References

External links 

2013 films
2010s Malayalam-language films
Indian comedy films
Films shot in Alappuzha
Films directed by Vysakh
Films scored by Gopi Sundar
2013 comedy films